The ACM A. M. Turing Award is an annual prize given by the Association for Computing Machinery (ACM) for contributions of lasting and major technical importance to computer science. It is generally recognized as the highest distinction in computer science and is colloquially known as or often referred to as the "Nobel Prize of Computing".

The award is named after Alan Turing, who was a British mathematician and reader in mathematics at the University of Manchester. Turing is often credited as being the key founder of theoretical computer science and artificial intelligence. From 2007 to 2013, the award was accompanied by an additional prize of US$250,000, with financial support provided by Intel and Google. Since 2014, the award has been accompanied by a prize of US$1 million, with financial support provided by Google.

The first recipient, in 1966, was Alan Perlis, of Carnegie Mellon University. The first female recipient was Frances E. Allen of IBM in 2006. The latest recipient, in 2021, is Jack Dongarra, of the University of Tennessee.

Recipients

See also

References

External links 

 ACM Chronological listing of Turing Laureates
 Visualizing Turing Award Laureates
 ACM A.M. Turing Award Centenary Celebration
 ACM A.M. Turing Award Laureate Interviews
 Celebration of 50 Years of the ACM A.M. Turing Award

Alan Turing
Association for Computing Machinery
Awards established in 1966
Computer science awards
Systems sciences awards
International awards